Mr. and Mrs. Ramachari is a 2014 Indian Kannada romantic drama film written and directed by Santhosh Ananddram and produced by the duo Jayanna and Bhogendra under the banner Jayanna Combines. It stars Yash and Radhika Pandit in the lead roles. The supporting cast features Srinath, Achyuth Kumar and Malavika Avinash. The story revolves around two characters: a tearaway and hot-headed youngster, Ramachari, who is a diehard fan of Vishnuvardhan, and his love interest, the sophisticated Divya.

The film was announced in September 2013; filming commenced in April 2014 and ended in September 2014. It was shot primarily in Bangalore and Mysore, and significant portions were filmed in Chitradurga. The cinematography was done by Vaidy S. and was edited by K. M. Prakash. V. Harikrishna composed the film score and the soundtrack. 

The film was a commercial success, completing a 200-day theatrical run and emerged the highest grossing Kannada film of the year. It was Yash's fifth consecutive success. The film won multiple awards at the Filmfare Awards South and SIIMA Awards. The Tamil remake rights of the film was bought by Escape Artists Motion Pictures in 2015. The film was remade in Marathi in 2016 as Mr. and Mrs. Sadachari  and in Odia in 2018 as Shakti  thereby becoming the fifth Kannada film to be remade into two non-Hindi non-South Indian languages after Anuraga Aralithu, Appu, Mungaru Male and Milana.

Plot
Ramachari is a short-tempered college-student, who is a die-hard fan of Vishnuvardhan from his childhood often watching his films. He gets inspired by the character Ramachari portrayed by Vishnuvardhan in Naagarahaavu and due to his waywardness, his relationship with his father Shankar is damaged to an extent where the father-son cannot stand each other. His father favours his elder son Hari, who is the ideal son, according to Shankar.

Ramachari hardly attends college and mostly hangs out with his friends Dattu and Chikkappa, thus being resented by Dattu's mother Sudha. At college, Ramachari encounters Divya, who is the new student in college, being ragged by seniors. However, Unknown to Ramachari, Divya is Dattu's sister. Ramachari instantly falls in love with her, who too reciprocates. He prefers calling her Margaret (based on actress Shubha's character in Naagarahaavu). The new-found love is sweet for Divya and Ramachari and they make a hot-headed decision to get married. But, they face problems with their relationship, which leads to a painful breakup.

Ramachari agrees to marry a girl Geetha of Shankar's choice to save his honor, and on hearing this, Divya attempts suicide. Later, Divya seemingly overcomes her hurt and agrees to marry Aakash, due of Sudha's choice. Both marriages are set on the same date and in the same town of Chitradurga. Both the weddings are managed by a wedding planner, Manche Gowda, who mixes up the photos of bride and groom, leading to confusing situations between either parties. 

On the day of the wedding, Ramachari gets Geetha married to her boyfriend Farhan, by convincing Geetha's father Venkatesh with Shankar's help and performs a monologue by Vishnuvardhan's statue at Chitradurga fort. Divya learns of this and breaks her engagement with Aakash where she reunites with him.

Cast

Production

Casting
It was revealed in September 2013, that the lead pair in the film would be Yash and Radhika Pandit. The film was their third together, after Moggina Manasu (2008) and Drama (2012). Sameer Dattani, in August 2014, said that he would be making a cameo appearance in the film.

Filming
The filming of Mr. and Mrs. Ramachari began in April 2014 in Bangalore. However, another report said, the film was shot in Goa in its first schedule before filming in Bangalore and Mysore. With the lead pair of Yash and Pandit playing the roles of college students in the film, the college scenes were filmed in Maharaja's College, Mysore. Team went on to shoot the climax portion in Chitradurga. Part of a five-day schedule, filming resumed in Nelamangala, Bangalore Rural district, after having completed the first part at Minerva Mills in Bangalore. Another song sequence for the film was then shot in Switzerland.

It was revealed that Ramachari, the character portrayed by Yash, in the film, is inspired by the character of the same name portrayed by Vishnuvardhan in his 1972 film Naagarahaavu. Yash, in the film, sports a tattoo of that character on his chest, played by Vishnuvardhan, and plays the role of a fan of the character. Speaking on this, the film's director said, "Just like the character of Ramachari in Naagarahaavu, our hero is a rebel and he is short-tempered. Moreover, he is a great fan of the Ramachari character itself and is inspired in life by it. He tries to lead a life similar to the character." Yash got the portrait of Ramachari tattooed on his chest on all days of filming, that took over an hour, done by Mayur, a  Bangalore-based tattoo artist.

Marketing
The film's first look revealing the logo and the crew was released on 8 September 2014. The first promos of Mr. and Mrs. Ramachari were released on 15 September. To mark the occasion of late actor Vishnuvardhan's birth anniversary, the first teaser of the film was released on 17 September. The first look poster of the film's lead actors was released on 19 September. It featured Yash holding Pandit by his left arm and a snake by his right. The official film trailer was released on YouTube on 15 December 2014.

Soundtrack

V. Harikrishna composed the background score for the film and its soundtracks. The album consists of six soundtracks. The track "Annthamma" was sung by the male lead in the film Yash, who made his debut as a playback singer with the track. The track had been recorded in the voices of the composer V. Harikrishna and Vijay Prakash, before it was decided that Yash record it.

Reception
The album was received well by listeners of which over 15,000 was sold by mid-February 2015. It was also among the most downloaded albums on the internet at around 3 lakhs.

Release and reception
The film was given the U certificate by the Regional Censor Board, without censoring any part of it. It was released theatrically on 25 December 2014 across Karnataka. Following good response at the domestic box-office, it was screened in the US, Germany and Ireland.

Critical reception
The film released theatrically on 25 December 2014, in over 200 theatres across Karnataka. G. S. Kumar of The Times of India reviewed the film gave the film a 3.5/5 rating and wrote that the film had a "neat plot, interspersed with lively sequences." Of the acting performances, he wrote, "Yash is brilliant, be it his expressions, dialogue delivery or style. Radhika Pandit delivers a winsome performance. Srinath, Achyuth Kumar, Malavika and Dhyan essay their roles with ease. Ashok Sharma shows promise of a good actor." He added crediting the film's music and cinematography. Writing for Bangalore Mirror, Shyam Prasad S. called the film "a visually appealing mass entertainer". He wrote praising the film's screenplay and the performances of all the actors, and its cinematography. A. Sharadhaa of The New Indian Express called the film "a family entertainer" and praised the film's screenplay, dialogues and the performances of Yash, Radhika Pandit, Achuyth Kumar, Malavika Avinash and Srinath. He concluded crediting the music, cinematography and editing in making the film "that works on many levels and is cheerful, romantic and emotional". S. Viswanath of Deccan Herald gave the film a rating of three out of five, and said the film was "Preachy and predictable". He wrote, "If only subtlety and sanity scored over predictable commercial claptrap, this Ramachari could have also risen to cult status of S R Puttanna Kanagal’s Naagarhaavu’s own eponymous hero." and added that it "condescends to clichéd contrivances".

Box office 

The collections of the film took a hit following its release a week after the release of the then already successful Hindi film, PK. However, it collected  on the day of its release, 25 December. At the end of its fifth day from release, it had collected , making it one of the biggest openings for a Jayanna Combines film or a Yash film. It went on to complete its 100-day run on 3 April. Following a good response domestically, the film was released in the United States, where it collected . In the process, it became one of the highest-grossing film of Kannada cinema.

Accolades

References

External links
 

2014 films
Films shot in Chitradurga
2010s Kannada-language films
Films scored by V. Harikrishna
2014 romantic drama films
Indian romantic drama films
Kannada films remade in other languages
Films shot in Switzerland
Films shot in Bangalore
Films set in Bangalore
2014 directorial debut films
Films directed by Santhosh Ananddram